Hymenocephalus lethonemus is a species of rattail. It occurs at depths of up to 485 m (1591 ft) in the waters off southern Japan, the Philippines and northern Taiwan.

This is a small, slender rattail with a total length of up to 14 cm (5.1 in). It has a fairly long, sharp snout, small eyes, a large mouth and no chin barbel. There is a long bioluminescent organ with two external lenses just in front of the anus.

References

Macrouridae
Fish described in 1904
Fish of Japan
Fish of the Philippines
Fish of Taiwan
Taxa named by David Starr Jordan